This is a list of airports that Avianca Perú flew to before it ceased operations in May 2020. The airline served 16 destinations.

References

Grupo TACA
Lists of airline destinations